Elections to North-East Fife Council were held in May 1980, the same day as the other Scottish local government elections.

Turnout was 46.8% in the contested wards, with the wards of Freuchie, Cupar North, and Largo, all returning Conservative councilors unopposed.

The election would be the last one to the North East Fife council won by the Conservatives, with the next election in 1984 signalling the beginning of the Liberal dominance of the council which would last until its abolition in 1995.

Election results

Ward results

References

1980 Scottish local elections
1980